Nesta or NESTA may refer to:

 Nesta (charity), an innovation charity in the UK, formerly the National Endowment for Science, Technology and the Arts (NESTA)
 Nesta (gastropod), a genus of gastropods

People
 Alessandro Nesta (born 1976), Italian footballer and manager
 Nesta Carter (born 1985), Jamaican sprinter
 Nesta Piper (born 1982), Montserratian cricketer
 Nesta Helen Webster (1876–1960), British historian, occultist and author
 Nesta Roberts (1913–2009), Welsh journalist 
 Nest ferch Rhys (c. 1085–before 1136), also known as Princess Nesta, daughter of Rhys ap Tewdwr
 Nesta Toumine (1912–1996), dancer, choreographer, artistic director and teacher in Canada
 Agnes Nesta Skrine (1864–1955), pseudonym of the Irish-Canadian poet Agnes Shakespeare Higginson
 Robert Nesta Marley (1945–1981), better known as Bob Marley

See also

Netta (disambiguation)